is a Japanese novelist.

Biography
Mariko Koike  is a popular detective and horror novelist. Koike was born in Tokyo and graduated from Seikei University. Her first collection of essays was Recommendations to Women of the World and it became a bestseller. She has been a novelist since her novel came out in 1986. Several of her novels have been translated in to English by Deborah Boliver Boehm. She lived with her husband writer Yoshinaga Fujita until his death on 30 January 2020. They lived in Karuizawa, Nagano Prefecture.

Awards
1989 Japan Mystery Writers' Association Prize, for Tsuma no Onnatomodachi (My Wife's Female Friend)
1996 Naoki Prize, for Koi (Love)
1998 Shimase Romance Literary Prize

Bibliography
The Graveyard Apartment. (one of the most read)
A Cappella.
The Cat In The Coffin.

References and sources

1952 births
Living people
Writers from Tokyo
Japanese women novelists
20th-century Japanese novelists
21st-century Japanese novelists
Japanese detective fiction writers
Japanese horror writers
Japanese essayists
Seikei University alumni